McCaslin Airport  is a public use airport located four nautical miles (5 mi, 7 km) north of the central business district of Lexington, a city in Cleveland County, Oklahoma, United States.

Facilities and aircraft 
McCaslin Airport covers an area of 140 acres (57 ha) at an elevation of 1,135 feet (346 m) above mean sea level. It has one runway designated 17/35 with a turf surface measuring 2,135 by 80 feet (651 x 24 m).

For the 12-month period ending January 14, 2010, the airport had 600 general aviation aircraft operations, an average of 50 per month. At that time there were four single-engine aircraft based at this airport.

See also 
 List of airports in Oklahoma

References

External links 
 

Airports in Oklahoma
Transportation in Cleveland County, Oklahoma
Buildings and structures in Cleveland County, Oklahoma